The Ballad and the Source is a novel by Rosamond Lehmann, first published in 1944 by Collins in the UK. Set in Edwardian England, the book deals with the relationship between Rebecca, a young girl, and Sibyl Jardine, a complicated and domineering elderly woman.

Contemporary reviewers compared the novel to the work of Henry James, though the book's feminism was then considered unfashionable.

Lehmann returned to the character of Rebecca in her last novel, A Sea-Grape Tree (1976), which follows her as an adult dealing with betrayal by a married lover.

References

External links
 Review, Kirkus Reviews, April 2, 1945

1944 British novels
English novels
William Collins, Sons books